The 2011 Ligue Haïtienne season was the 48th year of top-tier football in Haiti. It began on 1 May 2011. The league is split into two tournaments—the Série de Ouverture and the Série de Clôture—each with identical formats and each contested by the same 15 teams.

The league contracted from 16 to 15 clubs for this season.

Teams
Don Bosco, Eclair, Violette and Dynamite finished in 13th through 16th place in the overall table at the end of last season and were relegated to the Haitian second-level leagues. They were replaced by the two Haitian second level group winners: North Group winner Triomphe and South Group winner Valencia.

During the offseason, FICA took legal action against the Haitian Football Federation (FHF) for a spot in the league. In a ruling handed down on 28 April 2011, only days before the season began, the Court of Arbitration for Sport (CAS) ruled in favor of FICA, meaning they would be included in this season's competition.

Série de Ouverture

The 2011 Série de Ouverture began on 1 May 2011 and ended on 12 August 2011.

Standings

Results

Série de Clôture

The 2011 Série de Clôture began on 11 September 2011 and ended on 11 December 2011.

Standings

Results

Overall standings

Trophée des Champions
This match is contested between the winner of the Série de Ouverture and the winner of the Série de Clôture.

Source:

2011 Super Huit
The 2011 Super Huit competition (English: Super Eight) is a knockout tournament played at the end of the season among the clubs finishing in the top 8 of the overall standings for the season for cash prizes.

References

External links

2011
Haiti
2011 in Haitian sport